Claire Kuo (born Kuo Po-yu on 5 August 1980) is a Taiwanese singer and television host.

The daughter of a restaurant owner, Kuo graduated from Shih Hsin University and was a competitive cheerleader. She performed her final routine in November 2022, at the age of 42. After performing soundtracks for a number of Taiwanese television series, she released her debut album I Don't Want to Forget You in 2007, which garnered her numerous awards including Best Newcomer.

Discography

Studio albums

Extended plays

Compilation albums

Singles
2008: "The Start of a Smile'" ("微笑的起點") (With Angela Chang & Christine Fan)
2014: "Douchebag'" ("爛人") (With Xu Liang)
2015: "Be OK" (7-Eleven Kaohsiung Beer Festival Theme Song)
2016: "Don't Make Me Cry" ("别惹哭我") (Legend of Nine Tails Fox OST)

Filmography

Variety and reality show

Film

Music video appearances

Theater

Awards and nominations

Notes and references

External links 

 
 
 

1980 births
Living people
Taiwanese Mandopop singers
Shih Hsin University alumni
Taiwanese female dancers
21st-century Taiwanese singers
Taiwanese television presenters
Hong Kong emigrants to Taiwan
21st-century Taiwanese women singers
Taiwanese women television presenters